Uta Nickel (born 19 July 1941) is a German economist and one of the former finance ministers of East Germany.

Early life and education
Nickel was born in Leipzig on 19 July 1941. She studied economics.

Career
Nickel joined the ruling party of East Germany, Socialist Unity, in 1960. She served as the councillor of finance of Leipzig in the period between 1963 and 1976. She was state secretary for finances and prizes from 1988 to 1989. She was appointed minister of finance and prizes on 18 November 1989, replacing Ernst Höfner in the post. She was part of "reform-minded" cabinet formed by Hans Modrow.

She resigned from the office in January 1990 following the allegations that she was involved in illegal payments. Upon these accusations, she was investigated by the prosecutor general for financial breach of trust. Nickel denied any wrongdoing. Nickel's term officially ended on 12 April 1990 when Walter Siegert was appointed as acting finance minister.

After retiring from politics Nickel worked as a consultant for two property development companies based in Cologne.

References

External links

20th-century German women politicians
1941 births
Female finance ministers
Finance ministers of East Germany
German women economists
Living people
Women government ministers of East Germany
Politicians from Leipzig
Socialist Unity Party of Germany politicians